William Munt may refer to:

William Munt (martyr), Englishman martyred in the 1500s
William Munt (architect), worked in London in 1850